The following are notable writers, performers, stage managers, directors, producers, and musicians who have collaborated on revues at The Second City.

Alumni of Current Resident Stages

Chicago Mainstage (1959-present)
1959 – Howard Alk, Roger Bowen, Severn Darden, Andrew Duncan, Barbara Harris, Mina Kolb, William Mathieu, Sheldon Patinkin, Bernard Sahlins, Paul Sills, Eugene Troobnick
1960 – Alan Arkin, Paul Sand, Joyce Sloane
1961 – Bill Alton, John Brent, Hamilton Camp, Del Close, Melinda Dillon, Anthony Holland, Zohra Lampert, Alan Myerson, Joan Rivers, Avery Schreiber
1962 – Mona Burr, Dennis Cunningham, Dick Schaal
1963 – Jack Burns, MacIntyre Dixon, Ann Elder, Judy Elder, Melissa 'Sally' Hart, Richard Libertini, Omar Shapli
1964 – Ian Davidson, Eugene Kadish, Fred Kaz, Harv Robbin, David Steinberg
1965 – Joan Bassie, Robert Benedetti, Alex Canaan, Sondra Caron, Josephine Forsberg, Judy Graubart, Robert Klein, David Paulsen, Fred Willard
1966 – Bob Curry, Sid Grossfeld, Sandy Holt, Jon Shank, David Walsh, Penny White
1967 – J.J. Barry, Peter Boyle, Martin Harvey Friedberg, Burt Heyman, Lynne Lipton, Ira Miller
1968 – Murphy Dunne, Michael Miller, Carol Robinson
1969 – David Blum, Martin de Maat, Jim Fisher, Joe Flaherty, Nate Herman, Pamela Hoffman, Roberta Maguire, Judy Morgan, Brian Doyle-Murray, Harold Ramis, Eric Ross, Cyril Simon, Paul Taylor
1971 – John Belushi, Eugenie Ross-Leming, Dan Ziskie
1972 – Dave Rasche, Ann Ryerson
1973 – John Candy, Stephanie Cotsirilos, Tino Insana, Bill Murray, Jim Staahl, Betty Thomas
1974 – Dan Aykroyd, Cassandra Danz, Don DePollo, Michael J. Gellman, Allan Guttman, Deborah Harmon, Richard Kurtzman, Eugene Levy, Raul Moncada, Rosemary Radcliffe, Gilda Radner, Mert Rich, Doug Steckler, Dave Thomas, Paul Zegler
1975 – Bernadette Birkett, Miriam Flynn, George Wendt
1976 – Will Aldis, Eric Boardman, Steven Kampmann, Shelley Long, Jim Sherman
1977 – Cynthia Cavalenes, Larry Coven
1978 – James Belushi, Tim Kazurinsky, Audrie Neenan, Lawrence J. Perkins, Maria Ricossa
1979 – Danny Breen, Mary Gross, Bruce Jarchow, Nancy McCabe-Kelly
1980 – Meagen Fay, Lance Kinsey, Rob Riley
1981 – Susan Bugg, John Kapelos, Rick Thomas
1982 – Nonie Newton-Breen, Cheryl Sloane, Craig Taylor
1983 – Bekka Eaton, Ed Greenberg, Michael Hagerty, Isabella Hofmann, Richard Kind
1985 – Andrew Alexander, Mindy Bell, Jim Fay, Mona Lyden, Len Stuart
1986 – Dan Castellaneta, Rick Hall, Bonnie Hunt, Maureen Kelly, Harry Murphy
1987 – Steve Assad, Kevin Crowley, Aaron Freeman, Ruby Streak, Barbara Wallace, Ron West
1988 – Joe Liss, Mike Myers
1989 – Chris Farley, Tim Meadows, Joel Murray, David Pasquesi, Judith Scott, Holly Wortell
1990 – Tom Gianas, Bob Odenkirk, Tim O'Malley, Jill Talley
1991 – Fran Adams, Cynthia Caponera, Steve Carell, Michael McCarthy, John Rubano
1992 – Paul Dinello, Kelly Leonard, Ruth Rudnick, Amy Sedaris
1993 – Stephen Colbert, David Razowsky
1994 – Scott Adsit, Scott Allman, Jackie Hoffman
1995 – Rachel Dratch, Jon Glaser, Jenna Jolovitz, Adam McKay
1996 – Kevin Dorff, Tina Fey, Mick Napier
1997 – Jim Zulevic
1998 – Rachel Hamilton, T. J. Jagodowski, Susan Messing, Jeff Richmond, Tami Sagher, Rich Talarico, Stephnie Weir
1999 – Ed Furman, Beth Kligerman
2000 – Craig Cackowski, Sue Gillan, Angela Shelton
2001 – Debra Downing, Nyima Funk, Martin Garcia, Michael Kennard, David Pompeii
2002 – Brian Boland, Josh Funk, Robin Hammond, Alison Riley, Al Samuels, Abby Sher
2003 – Dan Bakkedahl, Lisa Brooke, Liz Cackowski, Antoine McKay, Jean Villepique
2004 – Brian Gallivan, Maribeth Monroe, Claudia Michelle Wallace
2005 – Matt Craig, Molly Erdman
2006 – Joe Canale, Ithamar Enriquez, Kirk Hanley, Marc Warzecha
2007 – Matt Hovde, Brad Morris, Amber Ruffin
2008 – Lauren Ash, Jim Carlson, Shelly Gossman, Anthony LeBlanc, Michael Patrick O'Brien, Emily Wilson
2009 – Andy St. Clair, Diana Martinez
2010 – Allison Bills, Tim Mason, Julie Nichols, Sam Richardson, Tim Robinson, Monica Wilson
2011 – Edgar Blackmon, Billy Bungeroth, Holly Laurent, Katie Rich, Jeremy Smith, Meghan Teal
2012 – Tim Baltz, Mary Sohn, Steve Waltien
2013 – Ross Bryant, Tawny Newsome
2014 – Ryan Bernier, Jesse Case, Chelsea Devantez, John Hartman, Paul Jurewicz, Mike Kosinski, Jacob Shuda, Daniel Strauss, Christine Tawfik, Emily Walker
2015 – Rashawn Nadine Scott, Sarah Shook, Jamison Webb
2016 – Shantira Jackson, Kelsey Kinney, Martin Morrow, Vinnie Pillarella, Lesley Stone
2017 – Ryan Asher, Tyler Davis, Jen Hoyt, Jeffrey Murdoch, Tien Tran, Nate Varrone
2018 – Emma Pope, Kimberly Michelle Vaughn
2019 – Mary Catherine Curran, Sarah Dell'Amico, Jaci Entwisle, Nick Gage, Andrew Knox, Dawn Kusinski, Asia Martin, Jordan Savusa, Adam Schreck
2021 – Adam Archer, Jeff Bouthiette, Jon Carr, Evan Mills, Anneliese Toft
2022 – Andy Bolduc, E.J. Cameron, Jen Ellison, Kiley Fitzgerald, Claire McFadden, Julia Morales, Sara Stock

Toronto (1973-present)
1973 – Dan Aykroyd, Andrew Alexander, Valri Bromfield, Jayne Eastwood, Gino Empry, Joe Flaherty, Fred Kaz, Brian Doyle-Murray, Gilda Radner, Bernard Sahlins, Gerry Salsberg, Sam Shopsowitz, Joyce Sloane
1974 – John Candy, Suzette Couture, Todd Jeffrey-Ellis, Piers Gilson, Allan Guttman, Eugene Levy, Catherine O'Hara, Sheldon Patinkin, Jim Patry, Mitchell Gold, Rosemary Radcliffe, Whitney S. Smith
1975 – Carol Cassis, Ben Gordon, Andrea Martin, John Monteith, Sharon H. Smith, Dave Thomas
1976 – Peter Aykroyd, Brenda Donohue
1977 – Del Close, Robin Duke, Steven Kampmann, Robin McCullouch, Martin Short, Dave Thompson, Peter Torokvei
1978 – Scott Baker, Sally Cochrane, Cathy Gallant, Len Stuart
1979 – Maggie Butterfield, Don DePollo, Don Dickinson, Melissa Ellis, Derek McGrath, Tony Rosato, Kim Sisson, Mary Charlotte Wilcox
1980 – Tom Baker, Gabe Cohen, Steve Ehrlick, John Hemphill, Kathleen Laskey, Denise Pidgeon, Wendy Slutsky
1981 – Ken Innes, Jerrold Karch, Deborah Kimmett, Jan Randall
1982 – Michael J. Gellman, Don Lake
1983 – Donald Adams, Bob Derkach, June Graham, Bruce Hunter, Ron James, Madelyn Keane, Debra McGrath, Lyn Okkerse, Bruce Pirrie, Jane Schoettle, Blaine Slekirk, Adrian Truss
1984 – Sandra Balcovske, Karen Poce
1985 – Dana Andersen, Bob Bainborough, Kevin Frank, Linda Kash, Dorothy Tenute
1986 – David Huband, Jeff Michalski, Mike Myers, Deborah Theaker, Mark Wilson
1987 – Tamar Malic, Ryan Stiles, Audrey Webb
1988 – Neil Crone, Wendy Hopkins, Lindsay Leese, Colin Mochrie, Alana Shields, Tim Sims
1989 – Patrick McKenna
1990 – Kathryn Greenwood, Karen Hines, Gary Pearson, Ed Sahely
1991 – Chris Earle, Nick Johne, Tara Charendoff, Jenny Parsons, Judith Scott, Peter Sherk, Brian Smith
1993 – Andrew Currie, Jackie Harris, Steve Morel, Paul O'Sullivan, Jonathan Wilson
1994 – Lori Nasso, Janet van de Graaf
1995 – Tamara Bick, Kerry Garnier, Albert Howell, Nancy Marino, Teresa Pavlinek
1996 – Jennifer Irwin, Mollie Jacques, Bob Martin, Jack Mosshammer
1997 – James Carroll, Marc Hickox, Melody Johnson, Arnold Pinnock, Angela V. Shelton
1998 – Mark Andrada, Gavin Crawford, Tracy Dawson, Andrew Dollar, Marypat Farrell, Jerry Minor, Doug Morency, Lee Smart, Gina Sorell, Jennifer Whalen
1999 – Paul Bates, Lisa Brooke, Kevin Dorff, K. McPherson Jones
2000 – Geri Hall, Carolyn Taylor, Sandy Jobin-Bevans
2001 – Aurora Browne, Jennifer Goodhue, Paul Constable, Nathan David Shore
2002 – Pat Kelly, Matt Baram
2003 – Jamillah Ross, Naomi Snieckus
2004 – Derek Flores, Rebecca Northan
2005 – Anand Rajaram, Lauren Ash, Steven DelBalso, Mick Napier, Klaus Peter Schuller
2006 – Jim Annan, Scott Montgomery, Matthew Reid
2007 – Marty Adams, Darryl Hinds, Karen Parker, Leslie Seiler
2008 – Ashley Botting, Kerry Griffin, Reid Janisse
2009 – Rob Baker, Dale Boyer, Adam Cawley, Caitlin Howden
2010 – Inessa Frantowski, Kris Siddiqi
2011 – Ashley Comeau, Jason DeRosse, Nigel Downer, Alastair Forbes, Carly Heffernan
2012 – Christina Cicko, Stacey McGunnigle
2013 – Craig Brown, Jan Caruana, Allison Price, Sophie Santerre, Connor Thompson, Kevin Vidal
2014 – Sarah Hillier, Etan Muskat, Kevin Whalen
2015 – Leigh Cameron, Kyle Dooley, Becky Johnson, Meg Maguire, Kirsten Rasmussen
2016 – Roger Bainbridge, Brandon Hackett, Lindsay Mullan, Ann Pornel
2017 – Georgia Priestly Brown, Nadine Djoury, Devon Hyland, Colin Munch, Paloma Nuñez, Allana Reoch
2018 – Jordan Armstrong, Christine Groom, Jen Hoyt, Sharjil Rasool, Chris Wilson
2019 – Tricia Black, Alan Shane Lewis, Natalie Metcalfe, Clare McConnell, Seann Murray, PHATT al
2020 – Andrew Bushell, Nkasi Ogbonnah, Gary Rideout, Hannah Spear
2021 – Connor Low
2022 – Andy Assaf, Andy Hull, David McIntosh, Jillian Welsh

Chicago ETC (1983-present)
1983 – Bill Applebaum, Rob Bronstein, Don DePollo, Jim Fay, Susan Gauthier, Carey Goldenberg, Jeff Michalski, Jane Morris, Bernard Sahlins, Joyce Sloane, Ruby Streak
1984 – Steve Assad, Dan Castellaneta, Isabella Hofmann, Maureen Kelly, Harry Murphy
1985 – Andrew Alexander, Len Stuart
1986 – Mark Belden, Mindy Bell, Kevin Crowley, Kevin Doyle, Joe Keefe, Barbara Wallace
1987 – Chris Barnes, Madeline Belden, Joe Liss, Ron West
1988 – Laura Hall, Judith Scott, Jill Talley, Holly Wortell
1989 – Mark Beltzman, Dan Gillogly, Nate Herman, Michael McCarthy, Ruth Rudnick
1990 – Fran Adams, Steve Carell, Tom Gianas, John Rubano
1991 – Rose Abdoo, Megan Moore Burns, Peter Burns, Ken Hudson Campbell, David Razowsky
1992 – Scott Allman, Stephen Colbert, Ian Gomez, Jackie Hoffman, Jenna Jolovitz, Kelly Leonard
1993 – Scott Adsit, Michael Broh, Jimmy Doyle, Norm Holly, Nia Vardalos
1994 – John Hildreth
1995 – Adam McKay, Jeff Richmond, Aaron Rhodes, Dee Ryan, Brian Stack, Miriam Tolan, Jim Zulevic
1996 – Neil Flynn, Laura Krafft, Jerry C. Minor, Horatio Sanz, Peter Zahradnick
1997 – Aaron Carney, Matt Dwyer, Rachel Hamilton, Mick Napier, Rebecca Sohn, Rich Talarico
1998 – Craig Cackowski, Kristin Ford, Noah Gregoropoulos, Tami Sagher
1999 – Ali Farahnakian, Martin Garcia, Sue Gillan, Beth Kligerman, Jack McBrayer, David Pompeii, Lyn Pusztai, Klaus Peter Schuller, Angela V. Shelton, Trey Stone, Michael Thomas
2000 – Dexter Bullard, Andy Cobb, Debra Downing, Abby Sher
2001 – Sam Albert, Joshua Funk, T. J. Jagodowski, Keegan-Michael Key
2002 – Peter Grosz, Nyima Funk, Jean Villepique
2003 – Jeremy Wilcox
2004 – Lee Brackett, Jen Bills, Rebecca Drysdale, Ithamar Enriquez, Robin Hammond, Frank Caeti, Matt Craig, Alison Riley
2005 – Rebecca Sage Allen, Jim Carlson, Alex Fendrich, Robert Janas, Chad Krueger, Niki Lindgren, Nicky Margolis
2006 – Amanda Blake Davis, Kirk Hanley, Andy St. Clair
2007 – W. Shane Oman, Marc Warzecha
2009 – Beth Melewski
2010 – Tim Baltz, Billy Bungeroth, Jesse Case, Brendan Jennings, Mary Sohn, Monica Wilson
2011 – Kyle Anderson, Aidy Bryant, Jessica Joy, Michael Lehrer, Jeremy Smith
2012 – Ryan Bernier, Mike Kosinski, Tawny Newsome, Andĕl Sudik, Chris Witaske
2013 – Carisa Barreca, Brooke Breit, Alex Kliner, Punam Patel
2014 – Jen Ellison, Eddie Mujica, Asher Perlman, Chris Redd, Tim Ryder
2015 – Lisa Beasley, Anthony LeBlanc, Scott Morehead, Rashawn Nadine Scott
2016 – Aasia Lashay Bullock, Laura Hum, Peter Kim, Katie Klein, Julie Marchiano
2017 – Sayjal Joshi, Andrew Knox, Alan Linic, Jasbir Singh, Jacob Shuda, Lesley Stone, Tien Tran
2018 – E.R. Fightmaster, Jen Hoyt, Katie Kershaw, Anneliese Toft
2019 – Atra Asdou, E.J. Cameron, Mark Campbell, Laurel Krabacher, Chuck Norment
2020 – Terrence Carey, Dawn Kusinski, Elise Wattman
2021 – Abby Beggs, Alex Bellisle, Jon Carr, Cat McDonnell, Tilliski Ramey
2022 – Claudia Martinez, Jordan Savusa

Alumni of Past Resident & Satellite Companies

Edmonton, Alberta (1979-1982)
Andrew Alexander, Bob Bainborough, Sandra Balcovske, Lorraine Behnan, Gabe Cohen, Bob Derkach, Ron Dickinson, Robin Duke, Michael J. Gellman, Christine Henderson, Sparky Johnston, Jerrold Karch, Gail Kerbel, Keith Knight, Don Lamont, David Mann, Kat Mullaly, Jeanette Nelson, Jan Randall, Mert Rich, Carol Sinclair, Kevin Smith, Veena Sood, Doug Stratton, Len Stuart, Adrian Truss

London, Ontario (1983-1992)
Donald Adams, Andrew Alexander, Dana Andersen, Elizabeth Baird, Sandra Balcovske, Jack Banks, John Bynum, Luc Casimiri, Alan Catlin, John Costello, Catherine Creary, Kimm Culkin, Martin de Maat, Patrick Dubois, Kevin Frank, Michael J. Gellman, Mike Goran, Kathryn Greenwood, Allan Guttman, David Healey, Karen Hines, Shari Hollett, Wendy Hopkins, Bruce Hunter, Todd Jeffrey-Ellis, Linda Kash, Madelyn Keane, Joe Keefe, Peter Keleghan, Deborah Kimmett, Elvira Kurt, Lindsay Leese, Frank McAnulty, Patrick McKenna, Steve Morel, Sue Morrison, Barbara Muller, Lori Nasso, Lyn Okkerse, Jenny Parsons, Bruce Pirrie, Karen Poce, Ed Sahely, John Erskine-Kellie, Jerry Schaefer, Jane Schoettle, Devin Scott, Paul Scott, Blaine Selkirk, Tim Sims, Brian Smith, Marilyn Smith, Rob Smith, Len Stuart, David Talbot, Deborah Theaker, Adrian Truss, Nia Vardalos, Audrey Webb, Jonathan Wilson, Mark Wilson

Northwest (Rolling Meadows, IL) (1988–1995)
1988 – Fran Adams, Andrew Alexander, Jon Anderson, Mark Beltzman, Bill Cusack, Fred Kaz, Tim O'Malley, David Pasquesi, Ruth Rudnick, Cheryl Sloane, Joyce Sloane, Len Stuart
1989 – Steve Carell, Christina Dunne, Jim Jatho, Sean Masterson, John Michalski, David Razowsky, John Rubano, Claudia Smith-Special, Faith Soloway
1990 – Ken Campbell, Kevin Crowley, Amy Sedaris
1991 – Scott Allman, Stephen Colbert, Paul Dinello, Ian Gomez, Jackie Hoffman, John Holtson, Megan Moore-Burns, Mick Napier, Charlie Silliman, Nia Vardalos
1992 – Scott Adsit, Tom Gianas, John Hildreth, Norm Holly, Mark Levenson, Aliza Murrieta, Aaron Rhodes, Mitch Rouse, Jim Zulevic
1993 – Peter Burns, Deborah Goldberg, Karol Kent, Kelly Leonard, John Thies, Tracy Thorpe
1994 – Renee Albert, Pat Andrews, Bernadette Birkett, Martin Brady, Matt Dwyer, Jennifer Estlin, Pat Finn, Michael J. Gellman, David Koechner, Ron West
1995 – Michael Bloom, Anne Libera, Theresa Mulligan, Todd Stashwick, Nancy Walls

Santa Monica, CA (1989)
1989 – Dana Andersen, Chris Barnes, Christopher Best, Mark DeCarlo, Andy Dick, Robin Duke, Teresa Ganzel, Michael Hagerty, John Hemphill, Bonnie Hunt, Fred Kaz, Richard Kind, Don Lake,  Jeff Michalski, Jane Morris, Joseph Plewa, Jan Randall, Ryan Stiles, Linda White

Detroit (1993–2007)
1993 – Andrew Alexander, Robin Bucci, Colin Ferguson, John Holston, Mark Levenson, Jerry C. Minor, Suzy Nakamura, Andrew Newberg, Lyn Okkerse, Tim Pryor, Jackie Purtan, Angela Shelton, Len Stuart
1994 – Tom Gianas, Nancy Hayden, Todd Stashwick
1995 – Peter Burns, John Farley, Joshua Funk, Dionna Griffin-Irons, Grant Krause, Emily Rose Merrell, Edd Smarron, Chris Smith, Rico Bruce Wade
1996 – Larry Campbell, Kim Greene, John Hildreth, Chad Krueger, Anne Libera, Trey Stone
1997 – Eric Black, Margaret Exner, Andrew Graham, Brandon Johnson, Keegan-Michael Key, Joe Latessa, Catherine Worth
1998 – Joshua Funk, Michael J. Gellman, Elaine Hendricks, Marc Evan Jackson, Mary Jane Pories, Ron West, Nyima Woods
1999 – John Edwartowski, Shatha Faraj, Joe Janes, Antoine McKay, Maribeth Monroe, Mary Vinette, Marc Warzecha
2000 – Dexter Bullard, Jeff Fritz, Kirk Hanley, David Razowsky, Cheri Lynne VandenHeuvel
2001 – Rob Chambers, Kiff VandenHeuvel
2002 – Scott Allman, Suzan Gouine, Lisa Maxine Melinn, Topher Owen
2003 – Jelly, PJ Jacokes, Shawn Handlon
2005 – Ken Faulk, Jenny Hagel, Quintin Hicks, Matt Hovde, Tiffany Jones, Caroline Syran Rauch
2006 – Jim Carlson, Amy Duffy, Nate DuFort, Brett Guennel, Shari Hollett, Tara Nida, Tim Robinson, Megan Hovde
2007 – Jaime Moyer

Las Vegas, NV (2001–2008)
2001 – Dan Bakkedahl, Frank Caeti, Kay Cannon, Joshua Diamond, Matt Dwyer, Jennifer Estlin, Mary Pat Farrell, Sarah Gee, Karen Graci, Kelly Haran, Fred Hemmiger, Joe Janes, Robin Johnson, Mike Lukas, Seamus McCarthy, Mick Napier, Phil Randall, Jason Sudeikis, Jean Villepique, Marc Warzecha, Mike Watkins
2002 – Scott Allman, Ed Goodman, Brooke Schoening, Holly Walker
2003 – Joe Kelly, Amy Rowell, Brian Shortall
2004 – Ithamar Enriquez, Martin Garcia, Lauren Dowden, Shatha Hicks, Bridget Kloss
2005 – Amanda Blake Davis, Paul Mattingly, David Novich, Craig Uhlir
2006 – Ryan Archibald, Jim Carlson, Shelly Gossman, Katie Neff, David Novich, Andy St. Clair
2007 – Rob Belushi, Michael Lehrer, Robin Lynn Norris, Bruce Pirrie, Anne Marie Saviano

Cleveland, OH (2002–2004)
2002 – Andrew Alexander, George Pete Caleodis, Maria Corell, Cody Dove, Colleen Doyle, Joshua Funk, Jack Hourigan, Kelly Leonard, Tommy LeRoy, Quinn Patterson, Dana Quercioli, David Schmoll, Ron West
2003 – Dave Buckman, Katie Caussin, Nate Cockerill, Lauren Dowden, Randall Harr, Chad Krueger, Joseph Ruffner, Kiff VandenHeuvel

Denver, CO (2006)
2006 – Dave Colan, Brendan Dowling, Jenny Hagel, Matt Hovde, Timothy Edward Mason, Beth Melewski, Amber Ruffin

Notable Alumni of Touring and Theatrical ensembles
1980 –  Julia Louis-Dreyfus
1989 –  Jane Lynch 
1995 –  Ian Roberts, Matt Walsh 
1996 –  Amy Poehler 
1997 –  Peter Gwinn 
2001 –  John Lutz 
2005 –  Jordan Klepper, T.J. Miller 
2007 –  Abby McEnany
2008 –  Steven Yeun 
2009 –  Vanessa Bayer, Thomas Middleditch, Amber Nash
2011 –  Cecily Strong
2012 –  Tara Ochs
2013 –  Ashley Nicole Black
2015 –  Ali Barthwell
2016 –  Felonious Munk

References

Chicago-related lists
Toronto-related lists
Lists of comedians